Buysky (masculine), Buyskaya (feminine), or Buyskoye (neuter) is the name of several rural localities in Russia:
Buyskoye, Kirov Oblast, a selo in Buysky Rural Okrug of Urzhumsky District of Kirov Oblast
Buyskoye, Nizhny Novgorod Oblast, a village in Vyazovsky Selsoviet of Tonkinsky District of Nizhny Novgorod Oblast